Michael Peter Muscala (/muˈSKĂ luh/; born July 1, 1991) is an American professional basketball player for the Boston Celtics of the National Basketball Association (NBA).

Early life
Muscala was born on July 1, 1991, in St. Louis Park, Minnesota, to parents Bob and Mary. His mother later married Thomas Maida. He has a stepsister, Madeline. Muscala grew up in Minnesota, and attended schools in Roseville, Minnesota, graduating from Roseville High School.

College career

Muscala played for the Bucknell Bison men's basketball team for four seasons. He was the 2011 Patriot League Men's Basketball Player of the Year after leading the Bison to an NCAA tournament appearance. In addition, he was named to the First Team All-Patriot League and AP All-American Honorable Mention in 2010–2011. He was a 2012–13 Academic All-America selection. He was also a 2012–13 Senior CLASS Award finalist. In 2013, Muscala also won the Patriot League Player of the Year, Defensive Player of the Year, and earned First-Team All Conference honors, becoming the first player in Patriot League history to earn Player of the Year and Tournament MVP twice. During his 2012–13 campaign, Muscala also became Bucknell's all-time leading scorer, surpassing Al Leslie's 32-year record.

Professional career

Obradoiro (2013–2014)
On June 27, 2013, Muscala was selected by the Dallas Mavericks with the 44th overall pick in the 2013 NBA draft. He was subsequently traded to the Atlanta Hawks on draft night, and later joined the Hawks for the 2013 NBA Summer League.

On August 1, 2013, Muscala signed a one-year deal with Río Natura Monbús Obradoiro of the Liga ACB. On February 25, 2014, he parted ways with Obradoiro and returned to the United States. In 20 games for the club, he averaged 14.6 points, 7.8 rebounds and 1.1 assists per game.

Atlanta Hawks (2014–2018)
On February 27, 2014, Muscala signed a multi-year deal with the Atlanta Hawks. He made his debut for the Hawks on March 2, recording four points and five rebounds in a loss to the Phoenix Suns. In the team's regular season finale on April 16, Muscala scored a season-high 15 points in a 111–103 win over the Milwaukee Bucks.

In July 2014, Muscala re-joined the Hawks for the 2014 NBA Summer League. During the 2014–15 season, he received multiple assignments to the Fort Wayne Mad Ants of the NBA Development League. On March 28, 2015, he had a season-best game with 18 points, 10 rebounds, 4 assists, 1 steal and 2 blocks in a loss to the Charlotte Hornets.

Muscala again played for the Hawks' summer league team in 2015, averaging 9.8 points and 7.3 rebounds in six games. On February 3, 2016, he scored a season-high 12 points in a 125–86 win over the Philadelphia 76ers. On March 26, 2016, he was presented with the Jason Collier Memorial Trophy for being the player who best exemplifies the characteristics Collier displayed off the court as a community ambassador.

On June 29, 2016, the Hawks exercised the option for the 2016–17 season on Muscala's contract.

On July 25, 2017, Muscala re-signed with the Hawks. On March 11, 2018, he scored a career-high 19 points in a 129–122 loss to the Chicago Bulls. On March 28, 2018, he set a new career high and led all scorers with 24 points in a 126–114 loss to the Minnesota Timberwolves.

Philadelphia 76ers (2018–2019)
On July 25, 2018, Muscala was traded to the Philadelphia 76ers in a three-team deal involving the Hawks and the Oklahoma City Thunder.

Los Angeles Lakers (2019)
On February 6, 2019, Muscala was traded, along with Wilson Chandler, Landry Shamet and a number of future draft picks, to the Los Angeles Clippers in exchange for Tobias Harris, Boban Marjanović and Mike Scott. The following day, he was traded to the Los Angeles Lakers in exchange for Michael Beasley and Ivica Zubac.

Oklahoma City Thunder (2019–2023)
On July 10, 2019, Muscala signed a 2-year deal with the Oklahoma City Thunder.

In November 2020, Muscala exercised his player option and returned for a second season with the Thunder. On January 25, 2021, Muscala made a career-high six three-pointers and scored 23 points during a 125-122 win over the Portland Trail Blazers.

On August 12, 2021, Muscala re-signed with the Thunder. On March 8, 2022, he underwent season-ending surgery on his right ankle.

On August 4, 2022, Muscala re-signed with the Thunder.

Boston Celtics (2023–present) 
On February 9, 2023, Muscala was traded to the Boston Celtics in exchange for Justin Jackson and two future second-round draft picks. Muscala made his Celtics debut a day later, recording 12 points and two rebounds in a 127–116 win over the Charlotte Hornets.

Career statistics

NBA

Regular season

|-
| style="text-align:left;"| 
| style="text-align:left;"| Atlanta
| 20 || 0 || 10.8 || .425 || .000 || 1.000 || 2.6 || .4 || .2 || .5 || 3.8
|-
| style="text-align:left;"| 
| style="text-align:left;"| Atlanta
| 40 || 8 || 12.6 || .550 || .409 || .880 || 3.0 || .6 || .4 || .5 || 4.9
|-
| style="text-align:left;"| 
| style="text-align:left;"| Atlanta
| 60 || 0 || 9.4 || .500 || .308 || .795 || 2.0 || .6 || .2 || .5 || 3.3
|-
| style="text-align:left;"| 
| style="text-align:left;"| Atlanta
| 70 || 3 || 17.7 || .504 || .418 || .766 || 3.4 || 1.4 || .4 || .6 || 6.2
|-
| style="text-align:left;"| 
| style="text-align:left;"| Atlanta
| 53 || 7 || 20.0 || .458 || .371 || .919 || 4.3 || 1.0 || .6 || .5 || 7.6
|-
| style="text-align:left;" rowspan=2| 
| style="text-align:left;"| Philadelphia
| 47 || 6 || 22.1 || .392 || .342 || .818 || 4.3 || 1.3 || .4 || .6 || 7.4
|-
| style="text-align:left;"| L.A. Lakers
| 17 || 4 || 15.6 || .434 || .368 || .875 || 2.6 || .8 || .2 || .6 || 5.9
|-
| style="text-align:left;"| 
| style="text-align:left;"| Oklahoma City
| 47 || 2 || 12.2 || .407 || .378 || .818 || 2.3 || .9 || .2 || .3 || 4.8
|-
| style="text-align:left;"| 
| style="text-align:left;"| Oklahoma City
| 35 || 0 || 18.4 || .446 || .370 || .917 || 3.8 || .8 || .2 || .3 || 9.7
|-
| style="text-align:left;"| 
| style="text-align:left;"| Oklahoma City
| 43 || 0 || 13.8 || .456 || .429 || .842 || 3.0 || .5 || .4 || .6 || 8.0
|-
| style="text-align:left;"| 
| style="text-align:left;"| Oklahoma City
| 43 || 5 || 14.5 || .438 || .394 || .795 || 3.1 || .9 || .3 || .4 || 6.2
|- class="sortbottom"
| style="text-align:center;" colspan="2"| Career
| 475 || 35 || 15.4 || .456 || .379 || .842 || 3.2 || .9 || .3 || .5 || 6.2

Playoffs

|-
| style="text-align:left;"| 2014
| style="text-align:left;"| Atlanta
| 2 || 0 || 2.5 || .000 || .000 || .000 || .0 || .0 || .0 || .0 || .0
|-
| style="text-align:left;"| 2015
| style="text-align:left;"| Atlanta
| 10 || 0 || 10.2 || .606 || .250 || .000 || 1.8 || .1 || .1 || .3 || 4.2
|-
| style="text-align:left;"| 2016
| style="text-align:left;"| Atlanta
| 9 || 0 || 7.4 || .500 || .333 || 1.000 || 1.9 || .3 || .0 || .1 || 2.7
|-
| style="text-align:left;"| 2017
| style="text-align:left;"| Atlanta
| 6 || 0 || 13.5 || .278 || .000 || .875 || 2.7 || .3 || .2 || .5 || 2.8
|-
| style="text-align:left;"| 2020
| style="text-align:left;"| Oklahoma City
| 2 || 0 || 10.0 || .500 || 1.000 || .000 || 2.0 || .5 || .0 || .0 || 1.5 
|- class="sortbottom"
| style="text-align:center;" colspan="2"| Career
| 29 || 0 || 9.5 || .480 || .263 || .900 || 1.9 || .2 || .1 || .2 || 3.0

College

|-
| style="text-align:left;"| 2009–10
| style="text-align:left;"| Bucknell
| 30 || 16 || 24.8 || .462 || .300 || .806 || 4.9 || .7 || .3 || 2.1 || 9.8
|-
| style="text-align:left;"| 2010–11
| style="text-align:left;"| Bucknell
| 34 || 34 || 27.8 || .517 || .364 || .816 || 5.5 || 1.3 || .4 || 1.9 || 14.9
|-
| style="text-align:left;"| 2011–12
| style="text-align:left;"| Bucknell
| 35 || 35 || 29.9 || .504 || .350 || .853 || 9.0 || 1.8 || .4 || 1.6 || 17.0
|-
| style="text-align:left;"| 2012–13
| style="text-align:left;"| Bucknell
| 34 || 34 || 31.7 || .509 || .250 || .789 || 11.1 || 2.2 || .5 || 2.3 || 18.7
|- class="sortbottom"
| style="text-align:center;" colspan="2"| Career
| 133 || 119 || 28.7 || .501 || .313 || .819 || 8.2 || 1.5 || .4 || 2.0 || 15.3

See also

 List of NCAA Division I men's basketball players with 2000 points and 1000 rebounds

References

External links

 

1991 births
Living people
American expatriate basketball people in Spain
American men's basketball players
Atlanta Hawks players
Basketball players from Minnesota
Boston Celtics players
Bucknell Bison men's basketball players
Centers (basketball)
Dallas Mavericks draft picks
Erie BayHawks (2017–2019) players
Fort Wayne Mad Ants players
Liga ACB players
Los Angeles Lakers players
Obradoiro CAB players
Oklahoma City Thunder players
People from Roseville, Minnesota
People from St. Louis Park, Minnesota
Philadelphia 76ers players
Power forwards (basketball)
Roseville Area High School alumni
Sportspeople from the Minneapolis–Saint Paul metropolitan area